The 1982 AIAW women's college slow-pitch softball championship was held in Graham, North Carolina, near Raleigh, on May 13–15. Twelve college softball teams met in the second and last AIAW national slow-pitch softball tournament. The AIAW conducted only two slow-pitch softball national championships, in 1981 and 1982, as the NCAA sought to and eventually did vanquish the women's collegiate athletic organization. The Amateur Softball Association later held two collegiate slow-pitch championship tournaments in 1983 and 1984.

Teams
The double-elimination tournament included these teams:

 Auburn
 Cleveland State	
 East Carolina
 Florida State
 Florida
 Georgia Southern
 Lakeland Community College (Ohio)
 North Carolina
 North Carolina-Charlotte
 Northern Kentucky
 South Florida
 Western Carolina

Top-seeded Florida State won its second consecutive national championship, winning all four of its games, including a win in the final over Florida, 9–4.

Bracket

The bracket included twelve teams with results as shown.

Ranking

See also

References

1982 AIAW Division I softball season
College softball championships